University Square is a neighborhood within the city limits of Tampa, Florida. As of the 2000 census the neighborhood had a population of 7,456. The ZIP Code serving the neighborhood is 33612. The neighborhood is close to many attractions and the University of South Florida.

Geography
University Square boundaries are the unincorporated community of University to the north, 30th Street to the east, Linebaugh Avenue to the south, and 15th Street to the west.

Demographics
Source: Hillsborough County Atlas

At the 2000 census there were 7,456 people and 2,802 households residing in the neighborhood. The population density was  7,285/mi2.  The racial makeup of the neighborhood was 51.0% White, 34.0% African American, 0.0% Native American, 2.0% Asian, less than 6.0% from other races, and 6.0% from two or more races. Hispanic or Latino of any race were 23.0%.

Of the 2,802 households 36% had children under the age of 18 living with them, 35% were married couples living together, 22% had a female householder with no husband present, and 8% were non-families. 28% of households were made up of individuals.

The age distribution was 29% under the age of 18, 30% from 18 to 34, 21% from 35 to 49, 11% from 50 to 64, and 9% 65 or older. For every 100 females, there were 97.2 males.

The per capita income for the neighborhood was $13,986. About 19.0% of the population were below the poverty line, including 40.0% of those under age 18 and 7.0% of those age 65 or over.

See also
Neighborhoods in Tampa, Florida

References

External links
University Square Civic Association, Inc.

Neighborhoods in Tampa, Florida